Mohammed Chakir (born 29 October 2000) is an Italian professional footballer who plays as a forward for  club Pro Patria.

Club career
Formed on Reggiana youth system, Chakir made his first team and Serie C debut on 19 November 2017 against Ravenna.

After a short spell in S.P.A.L. Primavera, in 2019 Chakir signed with Serie D club Legnago Salus, winning the promotion on his first season.

On 31 August 2021, Chakir joined Renate.

On 12 September 2022, Chakis signed a contract with Pro Patria for one season, with an option to extend.

References

External links
 
 

2000 births
Living people
People from Guastalla
Sportspeople from the Province of Reggio Emilia
Footballers from Emilia-Romagna
Italian footballers
Association football forwards
Serie C players
Serie D players
A.C. Reggiana 1919 players
F.C. Legnago Salus players
A.C. Renate players
Aurora Pro Patria 1919 players